is a railway station in the city of Kitanagoya, Aichi Prefecture,  Japan, operated by Meitetsu.

Lines

Station layout
The station has two opposed side platforms connected by a footbridge. The station has automated ticket machines, Manaca automated turnstiles and is staffed.

Platforms

Adjacent stations

Station history
The station was closed in 1944, but reopened on September 15, 1946. The station was an unattended station from 1946–1963. A new station building was completed in December 1980. The station was renamed to its present name on January 29, 2005.

Passenger statistics
In fiscal 2013, the station was used by an average of 10,370 passengers daily.

Surrounding area
 Nagoya University of Arts
 Nishiharu High School

See also
 List of Railway Stations in Japan

References

External links

 Official web page 

Railway stations in Japan opened in 1912
Railway stations in Aichi Prefecture
Stations of Nagoya Railroad